David Draper (April 16, 1942 – November 30, 2021) was an American bodybuilder, actor and author.

Early life
Draper was born in Secaucus, New Jersey on April 16, 1942. His weight training began at the age of ten and was a well-formed habit by the time he was about 12, in the mid-1950s. In high school he participated in wrestling, gymnastics and swimming, but was most inspired by training with weights.

Career

Bodybuilding
At 21, he won the Mr. New Jersey title. Six months later he moved to Santa Monica, California, working for the Weider Barbell Company until 1969. During this period he also worked in motion pictures.

In the early days of bodybuilding, Draper said "There wasn't a whole bunch of encouragement or inspiration from a society which considered you either stupid or egotistical and probably a sissy."

In California, Draper initially trained at a gym many called "The Dungeon", which he described as "a large, awful space dug out of the ground on the corner of 4th and Broadway", and later trained at the original Gold's Gym. He trained in the company of the world's top bodybuilders which included Frank Zane, Arnold Schwarzenegger, Franco Columbu, Mike Katz and Robby Robinson.

Draper was open about his past use of anabolic steroids: "I was ten years into my training, 235 pounds and already Mr. America before steroids came on the scene. I used them sparingly under a doctor's supervision and noticed marked improvement in my muscularity and separation."

Draper was 6'0" (1.83 m) tall, and his bodybuilding competition weight was approximately 235 lb. (106,6 kg).

Television appearances 
Appearing as David The Gladiator, Draper was a movie host on KHJ Channel 9 in Los Angeles, from 1964 to 1965. From 8–10 pm Saturday nights, he hosted a 'sword and sandal' movie from the 1950s and '60s.

Draper played himself in the 1967 episode of The Beverly Hillbillies titled, "Mr. Universe Muscles In," in which Granny thinks that he is ill with "the barbell bloat." The storyline included Draper suggesting that Ellie May is pretty enough to be "Miss Universe" which had the Clampetts thinking since he was Mr. Universe, that he wanted to marry Elly May, not understanding that "Universe" was not his last name.

He appeared in the 1967 movie, Don't Make Waves where he co-starred opposite Sharon Tate.

He appeared in The Monkees playing Bulk, in the October 16, 1967 episode "I Was a 99-lb. Weakling".  He later appeared in Here Come the Brides in the December 19, 1969 episode, "Lorenzo Bush".

Personal life
After a reported battle with alcoholism in the late 1970s and, with rehabilitation, gaining sobriety in 1983, Draper resumed his bodybuilding career to guest-pose at bodybuilding competitions and appear at exhibitions.

Draper continued to train with weights into his 70s, and to write, including a free weekly newsletter, emailed and published on his website until 2021. He died on November 30, 2021, at the age of 79.

Competition history
1962 Mr. New Jersey
1965 IFBB Mr. America Tall Class & Overall, 1st
1966 IFBB Mr. Universe Tall Class & Overall, 1st
1967 Mr. Olympia 4th
1970 AAU Mr. World 3rd
1970 IFBB Mr. World Tall & Overall, 1st
1970 NABBA Mr. Universe Tall, 3rd

Filmography
 Lord Love a Duck (1966) as Billy Gibbons
 The Beverly Hillbillies (1967) as Himself
 Don't Make Waves (1967) as Harry Hollard

Bibliography 
Brother Iron, Sister Steel 
Your Body Revival: Weight Loss Straight Talk 
Iron On My Mind 
West Coast Bodybuilding Scene Dick Tyler with Dave Draper, 
Iron In My Hands

See also 
List of male professional bodybuilders
List of female professional bodybuilders

References

External links 
 
 Biography of Dave Draper
 

1942 births
2021 deaths
American bodybuilders
People associated with physical culture
People from Aptos, California
Place of death missing
People from Secaucus, New Jersey
Professional bodybuilders
Strength training writers